The men's team recurve competition at the 2021 World Archery Championships took place from 21 to 24 September in Yankton, United States.

Schedule
All times are Central Daylight Time (UTC−05:00).

Qualification round
Results after 216 arrows.

Elimination round
Source:

Section 1

Section 2

Final round

References

2021 World Archery Championships